Ignatius Kutu Acheampong ((23 September 1931 – 16 June 1979) was the military head of state of Ghana from 13 January 1972 to 5 July 1978, when he was deposed in a palace coup. He was executed by firing squad on 16 June 1979.

Early life and education
Acheampong was born to Catholic parents of Ashanti origin. He attended the Roman Catholic schools at Trabuom and the St Peter's school (also Catholic) at Kumasi, both in the Ashanti Region of Ghana. He attended the then Central College of Commerce at Agona Swedru in the Central Region of Ghana.

Acheampong worked as a stenographer/secretary at Timber Sawmill in Kumasi and later taught at Kumasi Commercial College, where he became Vice Principal at Agona-Swedru College of Commerce. 

He was commissioned in the Ghana Army in 1959, and served as a member of the UN peacekeepers during the Congo Crisis.

Politics
Acheampong led a bloodless coup d'état to overthrow the democratically elected government of the Progress Party and its leader Dr Kofi Busia on 13 January 1972. 
He became head of state and chairman of the National Redemption Council (NRC), which was later transformed into the Supreme Military Council on 9 October 1975, with Colonel Acheampong (promoted to General) as its chairman. He proposed a 'Union Government' which means that, there would be power sharing between the civilian and the armed forces. This led to students demonstrations and closure of universities in Ghana. The violent clashes between pro and anti UNIGOV factions led to the death of at least four people in Kumasi.   

Notable historical changes and events introduced or implemented in Ghana during the period under Acheampong include: the change from the imperial to the metric system of measurement, change from driving on the left to right-hand traffic in "Operation  Keep Right", Operation Feed Yourself (a programme aimed at developing self-reliance in agriculture), "National Reconstruction" (aimed at promoting employment and skill for workers), face-lift projects in cities, and the reconstruction/upgrading of stadia to meet international standards.

There were, however, widespread accusations of both the encouragement and endorsement of corruption in the country under his rule.

A few months after Acheampong came to power, on 27 April 1972, former president Kwame Nkrumah died in exile.  Power in Ghana had changed hands several times since Nkrumah  was overthrown, and Acheampong allowed Nkrumah's body to be returned and buried on 9 July 1972 at the village of his birth, Nkroful, Ghana.

Execution
Acheampong was court martialed and executed along with General Edward Kwaku Utuka by firing squad on 16 June 1979. Ten days later, two other former heads of state, Akwasi Afrifa and Fred Akuffo, and senior military officers Joy Amedume, George Boakye, Roger Joseph Felli and Robert Kotei, were executed following the 4 June military uprising that brought Flight Lieutenant Jerry John Rawlings and the AFRC to power who were young officers. The AFRC brought Ghana back to civilian rule in September 1979 three months after the uprising.

Personal life 
Acheampong was married to Faustina Acheampong. His grandson is an American football player Charlie Peprah. His other Grandson is 6'9 Fulham FC striker Yakini Acheampong. His parents were James Kwadwo Kutu Acheampong and Madam Akua Manu

See also
National Redemption Council
Supreme Military Council
Corruption in Ghana

References

External links
 Ghana-pedia webpage – I.K. Acheampong

1931 births
1979 deaths
Ghanaian soldiers
Heads of state of Ghana
Leaders who took power by coup
Leaders ousted by a coup
Executed presidents
Executed military personnel
Executed Ghanaian people
People executed by Ghana by firing squad
People from Tema Municipal District
Defence ministers of Ghana
Finance ministers of Ghana
Information ministers of Ghana
People of the Congo Crisis
People executed for corruption
Ghanaian Roman Catholics